Robert Austin Shearer (March 16, 1868 – December 3, 1920) was an Ontario farmer and political figure. He represented Stormont in the Legislative Assembly of Ontario from 1914 to 1919 as a Conservative member.

He was born in Cornwall Township, Ontario, the son of James A. Shearer. In 1888, he married May Robertson. Shearer served as deputy sheriff. For a time, he was involved in the production of aerated water. He died in Cornwall.

External links 

Stormont, Dundas and Glengarry : a history, 1784-1945, JG Harkness (1946)

1868 births
1920 deaths
People from the United Counties of Stormont, Dundas and Glengarry
Progressive Conservative Party of Ontario MPPs